The United States Open Tennis Championships is a hardcourt tennis tournament held annually at Flushing Meadows, starting on the last Monday in August and lasting for two weeks. The tournament consists of five main championship events: men's and women's singles, men's and women's doubles, and mixed doubles, with additional tournaments for seniors, juniors, and wheelchair players.

The event was won by Victoria Azarenka of Belarus who beat Alexa Glatch of the United States, 6–3, 6–4 in the final.

Seeds

Draw

Finals

Top half

Section 1

Section 2

Bottom half

Section 3

Section 4

References

Girl's Singles
US Open, 2005 Girls' Singles